Reda Bellahcene (born January 21, 1993 in Schiltigheim) is a French football player who is currently playing for SC Schiltigheim in the Championnat National 2 Group B.

Club career

USM Alger
Reda Bellahcene, a defensive midfielder of 23 years who currently plays at Saint-Louis Neuweg, French club CFA. Formed in Strasbourg He spent his first professional contract with the champions of Algeria for three years, Bellahcene, who was tenured on 26 occasions in 30 matches so far with St. Louis who finished the season in eighth place in the Group B of the CFA should be an additional asset in the midfield usmiste already expanded by experienced players.

Urartu
On 2 March 2020, Bellahcene signed for FC Urartu.

Career statistics

Club

Honours
USM Alger
 Algerian Super Cup: 2016

References

External links

 

1993 births
Living people
People from Schiltigheim
Sportspeople from Bas-Rhin
Footballers from Alsace
French footballers
Algerian footballers
French expatriate footballers
French sportspeople of Algerian descent
Association football midfielders
SC Schiltigheim players
FC Saint-Louis Neuweg players
USM Alger players
MO Béjaïa players
DRB Tadjenanet players
FC Urartu players
FCSR Haguenau players
Championnat National 2 players
Championnat National 3 players
Armenian First League players
Algerian Ligue Professionnelle 1 players
Expatriate footballers in Algeria
Expatriate footballers in Armenia
French expatriate sportspeople in Algeria